Järvenpää is a town and municipality in Finland.

Järvenpää may also refer to:

 Järvenpää (surname)
 Järvenpää, Lahti, a district
 Järvenpää Plus, a political party

See also 
 

fi:Järvenpää (täsmennyssivu)